In Roman mythology, Acestes or Egestes was the son of the Sicilian river-god Crinisus by a Dardanian or Trojan woman named Egesta or Segesta.

According to Servius, this woman Egesta or Segesta was sent by her father, Hippotes or Ipsostratus, to Sicily, that she might not be devoured by the monsters which infested the territory of Troy and which had been sent into the land, because the Trojans had refused to reward Poseidon and Apollo for having built the walls of their city. When Egesta arrived in Sicily, the river-god Crinisus in the form of a bear or a dog sired with her a son named Acestes, who was afterwards regarded as the hero who had founded the town of Segesta.

The funeral games of Aeneas's father Anchises were held there. Those of Aeneas's folk who wished to voyage no further were allowed to remain behind with Acestes and together with Acestes's people they founded the city of Acesta, that is Segesta.

The Aeneid cites him as giving wine as a farewell gift to Aeneas as he is leaving Sicily.

Mythological tradition of Dionysius
The tradition of Acestes in Dionysius of Halicarnassus, who calls him Aegestus, is different, for according to him, the grandfather of Aegestus quarreled with Laomedon, who slew him and gave his daughters to some merchants to convey them to a distant land. A noble Trojan however embarked with them, and married one of them in Sicily, where she subsequently gave birth to a son, Aegestus. During the war against Troy Aegestus obtained permission from Priam to return and take part in the contest, and afterwards returned to Sicily, where Aeneas on his arrival was hospitably received by him and Elymus, and built for them the towns of Aegesta and Elyme. The account of Dionysius seems to be nothing but a rationalistic interpretation of the genuine legend.

Arrow of Acestes 
In the Aeneid, Acestes participates in a trial of skill in which he shoots his arrow which then bursts into flame as a sign from Jupiter of Acestes's deserved honor.

References 

Characters in Roman mythology
Characters in the Aeneid
Demigods in classical mythology
Children of Potamoi
Sicilian characters in Greek mythology